The Cedarville Yellow Jackets represent Cedarville University in intercollegiate sports. The Yellow Jackets compete at the NCAA Division II level as member of in the Great Midwest Athletic Conference (G-MAC) and also hold membership with the National Christian College Athletic Association (NCCAA). The official school colors are blue and gold. Men's sports include baseball, basketball, cross country, golf, soccer, tennis and indoor track and field, and outdoor track and field. Women's sports include basketball, cross country, soccer, softball, tennis, indoor track and field, outdoor track and field, and volleyball.

History
The university became a full member of NCAA Division II on July 12, 2012. In 2013 the university joined five other regional institutions to form the Great Midwest Athletic Conference.

Prior to joining the NCAA, Cedarville competed as a member of the National Association of Intercollegiate Athletics (NAIA) in the American Mideast Conference (AMC). Cedarville ended their 60-year-long affiliation with the NAIA after the 2010–11 academic year. The university was one of the founding members of the AMC, then known as the Mid-Ohio League, in 1949.

National championships

Team

Achievements 
In 2007, the women's track program placed 2nd in the nation among all NAIA divisions. Both the men's and women's basketball teams have advanced to the NAIA Division II national basketball championships.  In 2005, the men's team made it to the NAIA Division II final four, and in both 2004 and 2005 the women's team competed in the NAIA Division II championship game. Cedarville's women's sports won the AMC All-Sports Award for the 2004–2005 season. The women's cross country team won the school's only NAIA national title in any sport in 2001. The Lady Jackets also claimed the 2008 All-Ohio Intercollegiate Cross Country Championship which features all of the colleges and the universities in the state. They are the only NAIA program to ever win the All-Ohio women's title.

References

External links